Astrometis is a genus of sea star in the Asteriidae family. The genus has only one undisputed species. The genus occurs from Santa Barbara to the Gulf of California.

Species 
 Astrometis californica (Verrill, 1914). Status as distinct from A. sertulifera is disputed
 Astrometis sertulifera Fragile rainbow star (Xantus, 1860)

References 
ITIS Standard Report Page: Astrometis

CalPhotos: Astrometis sertulifera; Fragile Rainbow Star

Asteriidae